The Crown 34 is a Canadian sailboat, that was designed by Hein Driehuyzen and first built in 1975.

The Crown 34 design was later developed into the San Juan 34 in 1980.

Production
The boat was built by Calgan Marine in North Vancouver, BC, Canada, with 30 examples completed between 1975 and 1979.

After production of the Crown 34 ended in 1979, the molds were sold to GlassFab of Monroe, Washington, United States. That company only built five examples, under the name Sun 1020. The molds were then repossessed by Calgan and later sold again, this time to the Clark Boat Company in Kent, Washington. After some modifications, the design became the San Juan 34, which was introduced in 1980.

Design
The Crown 34 is a small recreational keelboat, built predominantly of fiberglass, with wood trim. It has a masthead sloop rig, a reverse transom, a skeg-mounted rudder and a fixed fin keel. It displaces  and carries  of ballast.

See also
List of sailing boat types

Similar sailboats
Beneteau 331
Beneteau First Class 10
C&C 34
C&C 34/36
Catalina 34
Coast 34
Columbia 34
Columbia 34 Mark II
Creekmore 34
CS 34
Express 34
Hunter 34
Sea Sprite 34
Sun Odyssey 349
Tartan 34 C
Tartan 34-2
Viking 34

References

Keelboats
1970s sailboat type designs
Sailing yachts
Sailboat type designs by Hein Driehuyzen
Sailboat types built by Calgan Marine